Nadine Fähndrich (born 16 October 1995) is a Swiss cross-country skier who represents Skiclub Horw.

She competed at the FIS Nordic World Ski Championships 2017 in Lahti, Finland.

Cross-country skiing results
All results are sourced from the International Ski Federation (FIS).

Olympic Games

World Championships
1 medal – (1 silver)

World Cup

Season standings

Individual podiums
 4 victories – (4 ) 
 8 podiums – (6 , 2 )

Team podiums
1 victory – (1 ) 
4 podiums – (4 )

References

External links

1995 births
Living people
Swiss female cross-country skiers
Cross-country skiers at the 2018 Winter Olympics
Cross-country skiers at the 2022 Winter Olympics
Olympic cross-country skiers of Switzerland
Tour de Ski skiers
Cross-country skiers at the 2012 Winter Youth Olympics
FIS Nordic World Ski Championships medalists in cross-country skiing
People from Lucerne-Land District
Sportspeople from the canton of Lucerne
21st-century Swiss women